Ahsan Mohomed Khan (born April 7, 1916, date of death unknown) was an Indian field hockey player who competed in the 1936 Summer Olympics.

In 1936 he was a member of the Indian field hockey team, which won the gold medal. He played one match as a halfback.

External links
 
 
 

1916 births
Year of death missing
Field hockey players from Bhopal
Olympic field hockey players of India
Field hockey players at the 1936 Summer Olympics
Indian male field hockey players
Olympic gold medalists for India
Olympic medalists in field hockey
Medalists at the 1936 Summer Olympics